The 2012–13 FA Women's Cup was the 42nd season of the FA Women's Cup, the main domestic knockout Cup competition in English women's football. It lacked a sponsor for the second consecutive season.

283 clubs were accepted into the competition. The first qualifying round commenced on 30 September 2012, with the first round proper played on 9 December 2012. Arsenal Ladies beat Bristol Academy 3–0 in the final on 26 May 2013 at the Keepmoat Stadium, Doncaster.

Birmingham City were the defending champions, having beaten Chelsea in last season's final.

Teams

Schedule 
The schedule for the 2012–13 FA Cup, as announced by the Football Association, is as follows:

Qualifying rounds 

All of the teams entering the competition that are not members of either the FA WSL, FA Women's Premier League National Division, FA Women's Premier League Northern Division or FA Women's Premier League Southern Division had to compete in the qualifying rounds to win a place in the competition proper.

First round proper 

The draw was made on 12 November 2012 with ties were scheduled to be played on 9 December 2012. Colne Valley Ladies were the lowest-ranked team left in the competition, competing in the Greater London Division 1 at level 8 of the English Women's football league system.

† – After extra time

Second round proper 
The draw was made on 10 December 2012 with ties were scheduled to be played on 6 January 2013. Colne Valley Ladies were the lowest-ranked team left in the competition, competing in the Greater London Division 1 at level 8 of the English Women's football league system.

† – After extra time

Third round proper 
The draw was made on 7 January 2013 with ties were scheduled to be played on 3 February 2013. Morecambe were the lowest-ranked team left in the competition, competing in the North West Women's Regional League Premier Division at level 5 of the English Women's football league system.

† – After extra time

Fourth round proper 
The draw was made on 4 February 2013 with ties were scheduled to be played on 24 February 2013. Oxford United Ladies were the lowest-ranked team left in the competition, competing in the South West Combination at level 4 of the English Women's football league system.

† – After extra time

Fifth round proper 
The draw was made on 25 February 2013 with ties were scheduled to be played on 17 March 2013. Oxford United Ladies were the lowest-ranked team left in the competition, competing in the South West Combination at level 4 of the English Women's football league system.

Quarter-finals
The draw for the quarter-finals took place on 18 March 2013, with Leeds United and Sunderland from the Women's Premier League National Division (2) remaining as the lowest-ranked teams.

Semi-finals 
The draw for the semi-finals took place on 1 April 2013, with the ties scheduled to take place on 26 and 28 April 2013.

Final

References

External links 
 The FA Women's Cup at thefa.com

Women's FA Cup seasons
Cup